Prantik railway station is a railway station of India in Birbhum district in the state of West Bengal. Its code is PNE. This railway station serves Bolpur surrounding areas including Santiniketan.

Trains 

Number of trains that halt at Prantik railway station is 38. Few express and passengers trains stop there. Some of are:
 Howrah–New Jalpaiguri Jan Shatabdi Express
 Howrah–Maldah Town Passengers
 Sealdah–Rampurhat Passengers
 Howrah–Rampurhat Express
 Viswabharati Fast Passenger
 Sealdah–Rampurhat Intercity Express
 Ganadevata Express
 Howrah–Maldah Town Intercity Express
 Maa Tara Express

References 

Railway stations in Birbhum district